Szklarnia Szymonkowska is a village in the administrative district of Gmina Wołczyn, within Kluczbork County, Opole Voivodeship, in south-western Poland.

References

Szklarnia Szymonkowska